The 1923 Utah State Aggies football team was an American football team that represented Utah State Agricultural College in the Rocky Mountain Conference (RMC) during the 1923 college football season. In their fifth season under head coach Dick Romney, the Aggies compiled a 5–2 record (4–2 against RMC opponents), finished fourth in the RMC, and outscored opponents by a total of 147 to 59.

Schedule

References

Utah Agricultural
Utah State Aggies football seasons
Utah State Aggies football